James Cochran may refer to:

James Cochran (North Carolina politician) (c. 1767–1813), Congressional Representative from North Carolina
James Cochran (New York politician) (1769–1848), U.S. Representative from New York
James Cochran (artist) (born 1973), Australian artist
James Cochran (merchant) (1802–1877), Irish-born merchant and political figure in Nova Scotia, Canada
James Cuppaidge Cochran, clergyman and editor in Nova Scotia
Jim Cochran, American farmer
Jimmy Cochran (born 1981), American alpine ski racer

See also
James Cochrane (disambiguation)